Valentin Dmitriyenko (born 8 June 1951) is a retired male hammer thrower, who competed for the Soviet Union during his career. He set his personal best (77.58 metres) on 26 August 1975 in Stuttgart.

Achievements

References
trackfield.brinkster

1951 births
Living people
Soviet male hammer throwers
Russian male hammer throwers
Universiade medalists in athletics (track and field)
Universiade gold medalists for the Soviet Union
Medalists at the 1973 Summer Universiade